The Porthos Range is the second range south in the Prince Charles Mountains of Antarctica, extending for about 30 miles in an east-to-west direction between Scylla Glacier and Charybdis Glacier. First visited in December 1956 by the Australian National Antarctic Research Expeditions (ANARE) southern party under W.G. Bewsher (1956-57) and named after Porthos, a character in Alexandre Dumas, père's novel The Three Musketeers, the most popular book read on the southern journey.

Features 

 Charybdis Glacier
It was mapped from ANARE surveys and air photos, 1955–65, and named by the Antarctic Names Committee of Australia (ANCA)(ANCA) for M.J. Corry, a surveyor at Mawson Station in 1965.
It was sighted by the ANARE southern party and named for Peter W. Crohn, a geologist at Mawson Station in 1955 and 1956.
 Cutcliffe Peak is a peak just south of Mount Mervyn. It was plotted from ANARE air photos of 1965, and named by the ANCA for M.A. Cutcliffe, an electrical fitter at Mawson Station in 1966, who assisted with the ANARE survey program.
It was plotted from ANARE air photos taken in 1956, and named by the ANCA for G.C. Hulcombe, a diesel mechanic at Davis Station in 1962.
 Martin Massif is a massif just east of Mount Lied. It was plotted from ANARE air photos, and was named for P.J. Martin, officer in charge at Mawson Station in 1964.
 Morgan Ridge is a small rock ridge trending east–west, standing between Mount Pollard and Mount Small. It was mapped from ANARE surveys and air photos, 1956–65, and was named by the ANCA for P.J. Morgan, a glaciologist at Wilkes Station in 1964.
The feature was plotted from ANARE air photos of 1965, and named by the ANCA for J.R. Canham, officer in charge at Wilkes Station in 1967.
It was plotted from ANARE air photos and named for D.F. Creighton, an electronics engineer at Mawson Station in 1963.
It was plotted from ANARE air photos, and was named for R.H. Eather, an auroral physicist at Mawson Station in 1963.
It was plotted from ANARE air photos of 1965, and was named by the ANCA for Joseph Gaston, an aircraft engineer with the ANARE Prince Charles Mountains survey party in 1969.
 Mount Gavaghan is a mountain between Mount Kirkby and Mount Creighton. It was plotted from ANARE air photos, and was named for E.J. Gavaghan, a radio operator at Mawson Station in 1963.
 Mount Kirkby is a very large, prominent, linear, flat-topped mountain on the northern face of the Porthos Range. The mountain was first visited by the ANARE southern party in December 1956, and was named by the ANCA for Sydney L. Kirkby, a surveyor at Mawson Station in 1956 and 1960.
It was plotted from ANARE air photos of 1965, and was named by the ANCA for A.G. Kerr, a physicist at Mawson Station in 1967.
It was visited by the ANARE southern party, and was named for Squadron Leader D.W. Leckie, Royal Australian Air Force, who commanded the RAAF Antarctic Flight at Mawson Station, 1956.
It was sighted by the ANARE southern party lin 1956 and named for Nils T. Lied, a weather observer at Mawson Station in 1956 and at Davis Station in 1957.
It was first visited by the ANARE southern party in 1956, and was named by the ANCA for James W. McCarthy, senior meteorologist and second in charge at Mawson Station in 1956.
It was sighted in December 1956 by the ANARE southern party and named for Mervyn Christensen, a weather observer at Mawson Station in 1956.
 Mount Pollard is a partly snow-covered mountain just south of Corry Massif and 3 nautical miles (6 km) west of Crohn Massif. Mapped from ANARE surveys and air photos, 1956–65. It was named by ANCA for J.R. Pollard, ionosphere physicist at Wilkes Station, 1964.
 Mount Small is a partly snow-covered peak standing 2 nautical miles (3.7 km) southwest of Crohn Massif. It was mapped from ANARE surveys and air photos, 1956–65. It was named by ANCA for G.R. Small, geophysicist at Wilkes Station, 1964.
 Mount Tarr is a mountain 1.5 miles (2.4 km) east-southeast of Mount Creighton. It was plotted from ANARE air photos of 1965. It was named by ANCA for F. Tarr, aircraft engineer with the ANARE Prince Charles Mountains survey party in 1969.
 Mount Ware is a mountain just south of Mount Kerr. It was plotted from ANARE air photos of 1965. Named by ANCA for W.R. Ware, weather observer at Mawson Station in 1968.
 O'Shea Peak is a small peak just south of Mount McCarthy in the eastern part of the Porthos Range. Plotted from ANARE air photos taken in 1956 and 1960. Named for J.H. O'Shea, radio officer at Wilkes Station in 1962 and 1964 and at Macquarie Island in 1966.
 Thomas Nunataks is a group of three nunataks lying 2 nautical miles (3.7 km) southwest of Mount Mervyn. Plotted from ANARE air photos of 1965. Named by ANCA for I.L. Thomas, physicist at Mawson Station in 1967.
 Webster Peaks is a group of five peaks 3 nautical miles (6 km) southeast of Mount Kirkby. Plotted from ANARE air photos of 1965. Named by ANCA for G.K. Webster, ionospheric physicist at Mawson Station in 1965.
 Whitworth Ridge is a rock ridge about 2 nautical miles (3.7 km) northeast of Mount Leckie. Plotted from ANARE air photos taken in 1956. Named by ANCA for R. Whitworth, geophysicist at Wilkes Station in 1963.
 Wignall Peak is a small peak just west of Mount McCarthy. Plotted from ANARE air photos taken in 1956 and 1960. Named for R. Wignall, weather observer at Davis Station in 1964.

References

External links
 Australian Antarctic Division
 Australian Antarctic Gazetteer
 United States Geological Survey, Geographic Names Information System (GNIS)
 Scientific Committee on Antarctic Research (SCAR)
 PDF Map of the Australian Antarctic Territory

Mountain ranges of Mac. Robertson Land